Christopher Herlihy "Hurly" Long (born 21 July 1995) is a German professional golfer who plays on the European Tour. He won the 2020 Italian Challenge Open.

Amateur career
Long attended Texas Tech University from 2015 to 2018, having been a freshman at the University of Oregon in 2014/15. He won the 2017 Carmel Cup after a playoff, which included a second-round 61 to set a new course record at Pebble Beach. He was part of the German team in three Eisenhower Trophy tournaments: 2014, 2016 and 2018.

Professional career
Long turned professional at the start of 2019 and played on the Pro Golf Tour in his first year as a professional. He had a successful season, winning the Raiffeisen Pro Golf Tour St. Pölten in July after a final round of 60. During the season he was also runner-up three times, third twice and had 7 other top-10 finishes. He won the Order of Merit and gained a place on the Challenge Tour for 2020.

Long had little success on the 2020 Challenge Tour until he won the Italian Challenge Open Eneos Motor Oil in early October, an event reduced to 54 holes by bad weather. Long won with a birdie at the second hole of a playoff.

Amateur wins
2013 Doral-Publix Junior Classic 16–18
2016 German International Amateur Championship
2017 The Carmel Cup

Source:

Professional wins (2)

Challenge Tour wins (1)

*Note: The 2020 Italian Challenge Open Eneos Motor Oil was shortened to 54 holes due to rain.

Challenge Tour playoff record (1–0)

Pro Golf Tour wins (1)

Team appearances
Amateur
Eisenhower Trophy (representing Germany): 2014, 2016, 2018
Arnold Palmer Cup (representing the International team): 2018
European Amateur Team Championship (representing Germany): 2014, 2015, 2016, 2017, 2018

See also
2021 Challenge Tour graduates

References

External links

German male golfers
Olympic golfers of Germany
Golfers at the 2020 Summer Olympics
Oregon Ducks men's golfers
Texas Tech Red Raiders men's golfers
Sportspeople from Heidelberg
1995 births
Living people